Religion in the European Union is diverse. The largest religion in the EU is Christianity, which accounted for 72.8% of EU population . Smaller groups include those of Islam, Buddhism, Judaism, Hinduism, and some East Asian religions, most concentrated in Germany and France. Also present are revival movements of pre-Christianity European folk religions including Heathenism, Rodnovery, Romuva, and Druidry.

Over the last several decades, religious practice has been on the decline in a process of secularisation. Eurostat's Eurobarometer survey in 2010 showed that 20% of EU citizens don't believe there is any sort of spirit, god, or life force. Many countries have experienced falling church attendance and membership in recent years.

The countries with the most people reporting no belief in any sort of spirit, god, or  higher power are France (40%), Czech Republic (37%), Sweden (34%), Netherlands (30%), Estonia (29%), Germany (27%), Belgium (27%) and Slovenia (26%). The most religious countries are Romania (1% non-believers) and Malta (2% non-believers). Across the EU, belief is more common with older age and is higher amongst women, those with only basic education, and those "positioning themselves on the right of the political scale (57%)".

Church and state
The EU is a secular body with a separation of church and state. There are no formal ties to any religion and no mention of any specific religion in any current or proposed treaty. Discussion over the European Constitution's draft texts and later the Treaty of Lisbon have included proposals to mention Christianity and/or God in the preamble of the document. This call has been supported by Christian religious leaders, most notably the Pope. However, the explicit inclusion of a link to religion faced opposition from secularists, and the final Constitution referred to Europe's "Religious and Humanist inheritance". A second attempt to include Christianity in the treaty was undertaken in 2007 with the drafting of the Treaty of Lisbon. Angela Merkel promised the Pope that she would use her influence during Germany's presidency to try to include a reference to Christianity and God in the treaty. This has provoked opposition, not least in the German press, and as this inclusion may have caused problems in reaching a final agreement, this attempt was given up. Of the Union's 27 states, only three have an official state religion, these being Denmark (Church of Denmark), Greece (Church of Greece), and Malta (Catholic Church). Some other churches have a close relationship with the state. Until 2000, the Church of Sweden was the state church of Sweden.

In the secularising EU, The Vatican has been vocal against a perceived "militant atheism". It based this on a number of events, for example: the rejection of religious references in the Constitution and Treaty of Lisbon, the rejection by Parliament of Rocco Buttiglione as Justice Commissioner in 2004, while at the same time Parliament approved Peter Mandelson (who is gay) as Trade Commissioner, and the legalisation of same-sex marriage in countries such as the Netherlands, Belgium, and Spain. The European Parliament has also been calling for same-sex marriages to be recognised across the EU. Meanwhile, states such as Latvia and Poland have rejected legislation designed to stop discrimination against homosexuals. This has been stated to be on religious grounds, with homosexual behaviour described as "unnatural", and the Catholic Church influencing public opinion. The difference of opinion between these countries and Brussels has been damaging relations.

Due to the rise of other religions, and some intolerance towards them, the EU Commission now regularly meets with different religious leaders. In November 2005, a delegation from the European Humanist Federation was invited to a meeting by Commissioner-President Barroso. This was the first time a humanist group had been consulted in this manner by the Commission. President Romano Prodi has refused such meetings, despite meeting various religious leaders, causing some resentment by humanists.

Secularisation
Atheism and agnosticism have increased among the general population in Europe, with falling church attendance and membership in many countries. The countries where the most people reported no religious belief were France (40%), Czech Republic (37%), Sweden (34%), Netherlands (30%), Estonia (29%), Germany (27%), Belgium (27%) and Slovenia (26%). The most religious societies are those in Romania with 1% non-believers and Malta with 2% non-believers. Across the EU, belief was higher among: the elderly, those with strict upbringings, those with the lowest levels of formal education, those leaning towards right-wing politics, and those more concerned with moral and ethical issues in science and technology over risk-benefit analysis.

In 2012, the highest ever number of births outside of marriage were recorded in the European Union, at 40%, with first-births out of wedlock and cohabitation figures being even higher. Seven EU countries recorded a majority of births outside of marriage – Estonia (59% in 2014), Bulgaria (58.8% in 2014), Slovenia (58.3% in 2014), France (57.4% in 2014), Sweden (54.4% in 2013), Belgium (52.3% in 2012), and Denmark (51.5% in 2013). These countries tend to be some of the less religious ones.

Religiosity
Most EU countries have experienced a decline in church attendance, as well as a decline in the number of people professing belief. The 2010 Eurobarometer survey found that, on average, 51% of the citizens of the EU Member States state that they believe there is a god, 26% state that they believe there is some sort of spirit or life force and 20% state that they don't believe there is any sort of spirit, god or life force. 3% declined to answer. According to a recent study (Dogan, Mattei, Religious Beliefs in Europe: Factors of Accelerated Decline), 47% of French people declared themselves as agnostics in 2003. The situation of religion varies between countries in European Union. A decrease in religiousness and church attendance in Western Europe (especially in the Netherlands, Belgium, the United Kingdom, France, Germany, Finland, Norway, Sweden, Denmark, Spain, Portugal, Austria, Luxembourg and Czech Republic) has been noted and called "Post-Christian Europe". There has also been a sharp reduction in church attendance since 2005 in Poland, the most populous Eastern European EU member state, although with church attendance at 41.5% in 2009, it is still well above the single-digit figures that are so typical for Sunday service attendance in other EU countries.

The following is a list of European countries ranked by religiosity, based on the rate of belief, according to the 2010 Eurobarometer survey. The 2010 Eurobarometer survey asked whether the person "believes there is a God", "believes there is some sort of spirit or life force" or "doesn't believe there is any sort of spirit, God or life force".

Religious affiliation

Diversity
It was estimated that the Union's Muslim population in 2009 was 13 million people. The country with the largest number of Muslims in western Europe is believed to be France with an estimated 6–7 million (though the French census does not ask religious questions) followed by Germany (4.5 million), the United Kingdom (2.7 million) and Italy (1.5 million). Aside from Turkey, the other possible future member to have a majority of Muslims is Albania, although other Balkan states like Bosnia (where Muslims enjoy a plurality), Montenegro and North Macedonia also have sizeable Muslim populations. Kosovo is also a Muslim majority state (but doesn't enjoy universal diplomatic recognition). A series of clashes and incidents connected to the religion have occurred in recent years, including: the murder of Theo van Gogh, the 2004 Madrid train bombings, the Jyllands-Posten Muhammad cartoons controversy, and the 7 July 2005 London bombings. In response to extremism, some figures, such as Justice Freedom & Security Commissioner Franco Frattini, have suggested creating a "European Islam" – a branch of the Islamic faith that is compatible with European values.

Judaism has had a long history in Europe going back to the Roman Empire. Prior to the Holocaust, the area of the European Union had a Jewish population of 5,375,000 but they were largely exterminated in Nazi concentration camps. In 2002, the EU had a Jewish population of barely over a million, including about 519,000 in France and about 273,500 in the United Kingdom. This can be compared with about 5.8 million Jews living in Israel. In view of the history of persecution of Jews in Europe, antisemitism remains a matter of attention within the EU.

Following the nationalization of the former British colonies in the 1960s and 1970s, many Hindus migrated to Europe from India and East Africa, often with British passports allowing them to pursue a future in Britain (which is no longer part of the EU). The Netherlands has also been a top destination for migrating Hindus, worldwide. Many Hindus who originally arrived in the country did not come directly from places like India, however. Hindus began arriving in the Netherlands in larger numbers beginning in the 1970s. This group came from Suriname, which was a Dutch colony up until 1975. Many more Hindus came in another wave of migration starting in the early 1980s spurred by the conflict in Sri Lanka that targeted Tamils. Hindus in Europe originate from different countries and practice their faith in different ways, depending on the group of Hinduism they belong to. As of 2021, there are more than 750,000 adherents in various EU member states with around 130 temples servicing their respective communities.

See also

 Religion in Europe
 Culture of the European Union
 Fundamental Rights Agency
 Holy See–European Union relations
 Christianity in Europe
 Judaism in Europe
 Islam in Europe
 List of religious populations
 Major world religions

References

External links
 Eurel: sociological and legal data on religions in Europe and beyond

Religion in Europe
European Union and the Catholic Church
European Union society